Billy Joe Thomas (August 7, 1942 – May 29, 2021) was an American singer widely known for his pop, country and Christian hits of the 1960s, 1970s and 1980s. 

Popular songs by Thomas include "Hooked on a Feeling" (1968), "Raindrops Keep Fallin' on My Head" (1969), "(Hey Won't You Play) Another Somebody Done Somebody Wrong Song" (1975), "Don't Worry Baby" (1977) and "Whatever Happened to Old-Fashioned Love" (1983).

In 2014, "Raindrops Keep Fallin' on My Head" was inducted into the Grammy Hall of Fame.

Early life and education 
Thomas was born in Hugo, Oklahoma, on August 7, 1942. He was the son of Geneva and Vernon Thomas. Thomas grew up in and around Houston, Texas, and graduated from Lamar Consolidated High School in Rosenberg. Before his solo career, he sang in a church choir as a teenager.

Thomas later joined the musical group The Triumphs with Tim Griffith (lead guitar), Tom Griffith (bass), Denver "Zeke" Zatyka (keyboards), Don Drachenberg (vocal and sax) and Ted Mensik (drums). During his senior year, he made friends with Roy Head of Roy Head and The Traits. The Traits and the Triumphs held several Battle of the Bands events in the early 1960s.

Music career

1960s–1970s
In 1966, Thomas and the Triumphs released the album I'm So Lonesome I Could Cry (Pacemaker Records), featuring a hit cover of the Hank Williams song "I'm So Lonesome I Could Cry". The single sold over one million copies and was awarded a gold disc. The follow-up single, "Mama", peaked at No. 22. In the same year, Thomas released a solo album of the same title on the Scepter Records label.

Thomas achieved mainstream success again in 1968, with the song "The Eyes of a New York Woman". Five months later, the more successful single "Hooked on a Feeling" featured the sound of Reggie Young's electric sitar, and was first released on the album On My Way via Scepter Records. "Hooked on a Feeling" became Thomas' second million-selling record. A year later, Butch Cassidy and the Sundance Kid featured Thomas performing the Bacharach/David song "Raindrops Keep Fallin' on My Head", which won the Academy Award for best original song that year. The song reached No. 1 on the Billboard Hot 100 in January 1970. Its sales also exceeded one million copies, with Thomas being awarded his third gold record. The song was also released on an album of the same title. His other hits of the 1970s included: "Everybody's Out of Town", "I Just Can't Help Believing" (reached No. 9 in 1970 and was covered by Elvis Presley), "No Love at All", "Mighty Clouds of Joy" and "Rock and Roll Lullaby".

After experiencing hits with Scepter Records, his label for six years, Thomas left the label in 1972. He spent a short period with Paramount Records in 1973 and 1974, during which time he released Songs (1973) and Longhorns & Londonbridges (1974).

In 1975, Thomas released the album Reunion on ABC Records, which had absorbed the Paramount label. It contained "(Hey Won't You Play) Another Somebody Done Somebody Wrong Song", which was the longest-titled No. 1 hit ever on the Hot 100. It was his first big hit since 1972 and secured him his fourth gold record.

In 1976, Thomas released Home Where I Belong, produced by Chris Christian on Myrrh Records, the first of several gospel albums. It was the first Christian album to go platinum, and Thomas became one of the biggest contemporary Christian musical artists of the period. Thomas embraced his newfound faith, but sometimes clashed with fundamentalist Christian fans because he still performed his previous popular hits.

On MCA Records, Thomas and Chris Christian recorded his last Top 40 hit single, "Don't Worry Baby". It appeared on his last pop album, which also included the Adult Contemporary hit "Still the Lovin' Is Fun".

1980s–2010s
During the 1980s, Thomas had little success on the pop charts, but some of his singles topped the country singles chart. Two of those songs included "Whatever Happened to Old-Fashioned Love" and "New Looks from an Old Lover" in 1983. Additionally, "Two Car Garage" reached No. 3 on the country charts. In 1981, on his 39th birthday, Thomas became the 60th member of the Grand Ole Opry. His Opry membership later lapsed, with the Opry having classified him as a non-regular "guest artist".

Thomas scored another hit, recording "As Long as We Got Each Other", the theme music to the television series Growing Pains. The first-season theme was a solo for Thomas, but was re-recorded as a duet with Jennifer Warnes for the second and third seasons. For the show's fourth season, it was re-recorded again with British singer Dusty Springfield, but the Thomas/Warnes version was reinstated for season five and some of season seven. Thomas first released this track on his 1985 album Throwing Rocks at the Moon via Columbia Records.

Thomas also wrote two books, including the autobiography Home Where I Belong, and starred in the movies Jory and Jake's Corner. Several commercial jingles, including ones for Coca-Cola, Pepsi and Bell Telephone, have featured his singing voice and music. On December 31, 2011, Thomas was the featured halftime performer at the 2011 Hyundai Sun Bowl in El Paso, Texas.

On April 2, 2013, Thomas released The Living Room Sessions, an album with acoustic arrangements of well-known hits. It featured guest appearances with established and emerging vocalists, accompanying Thomas on seven of the album's twelve tracks.

On December 3, 2013, the National Academy of Recording Arts and Sciences announced that the 1969 single "Raindrops Keep Fallin' on My Head" by Thomas would be inducted into the 2014 Grammy Hall of Fame.

Personal life and death 
Thomas married singer-songwriter Gloria Richardson in December 1968. They had three daughters: Paige (born 1970), Nora (adopted from North Korea in 1978) and Erin (born in 1979). 

Shortly after his career began, Thomas became dependent on drugs and alcohol, which led to his marriage nearly ending. On January 28, 1976, Thomas became a Christian, less than a month after Gloria did. Most press sources indicated that Thomas had been sober since he and Gloria reconciled in 1976.

On March 23, 2021, Thomas announced on his official Facebook page that he had stage IV lung cancer and was being treated in Texas. He died on May 29 at his home in Arlington, Texas, at the age of 78.

Selective discography 

 On My Way (1968)
 Longhorns & Londonbridges (1974)
 Reunion (1975)
 You Gave Me Love (When Nobody Gave Me a Prayer) (1979)
 Love Shines (1983)
 Love to Burn (2007)
 The Living Room Sessions (2013)

Awards and nominations

References

External links 

1942 births
2021 deaths
ABC Records artists
American autobiographers
American country singers
American gospel singers
American performers of Christian music
American male pop singers
Columbia Records artists
Country musicians from Oklahoma
Country musicians from Texas
Deaths from cancer in Texas
Deaths from lung cancer
Gold Star Records artists
Grammy Award winners
Grand Ole Opry members
Male actors from Houston
Male actors from Oklahoma
MCA Records artists
Musicians from Houston
People from Hugo, Oklahoma
People from Rosenberg, Texas
Myrrh Records artists
Scepter Records artists
Wand Records artists
Singers from Oklahoma
Singers from Texas
Writers from Oklahoma
Writers from Texas
20th-century American male actors
20th-century American singers
20th-century American non-fiction writers
21st-century American male actors
21st-century American singers
21st-century American non-fiction writers
20th-century American male singers
21st-century American male singers